Ernest Archibald Taylor (5 September 1874 – November, 1951), better known as E A Taylor, was a Scottish artist, an oil painter,  watercolourist and etcher, and a designer of furniture, interiors and stained glass.

Life

Taylor was born in Greenock, Scotland, in 1874, the fifteenth of seventeen children of an army major. Initially apprenticed in the Glasgow shipbuilding industry on the River Clyde, he trained as an artist at the Glasgow School of Art, where he met and married Jessie M. King in 1908. They  moved to Salford, where he designed for George Wragge Ltd, producing many designs for stained-glass windows, including domestic work for the Scottish engineer Sir William Arrol at Seafield House in Ayr. Between 1911 and 1914 the Taylors lived in Paris where they established an art school – the Shearling Atelier. The influence of modern French art and the Ballets Russes can be seen in Taylor's art: his style broadened and he began to make more use of dramatic outlines.

On their return to Scotland at the outbreak of  the First World War, Taylor and King settled at The Greengate in the High Street in Kirkcudbright, where S J Peploe was a frequent visitor. They established a summer school at High Corrie on the Isle of Arran, as well as locally in Kirkcudbright. Taylor's work, like that of his wife, became more powerful and dramatic during their time in Galloway, closer in style to the Scottish Colourists.

A number of Taylor's paintings are in public collections, including Glasgow Museums.

Style
His early watercolours are delicate and original in design. His watercolour work from around 1900–10 invoked a successful balance between Naturalism (arts) and stylisation. During these  years he often painted on Arran, whilst working for the Glasgow cabinetmakers Wylie and Lochhead.

His oils, painted in broad brushstrokes, depict the rugged landscape of the Western Highlands, often with a white croft set against a dark rock face.

References

External links
Artists Footsteps website
EA Taylor's biography & artwork from the Permanent Collection of the Gracefield Arts Centre in Dumfries, Scotland biography & virtual representation of EA Taylor's artwork of Gracefield Arts Centre at exploreart.co.uk
The Kirkcudbright School
Taylor's biography and works

1874 births
1951 deaths
19th-century Scottish painters
Scottish male painters
20th-century Scottish painters
People from Greenock
Scottish designers
British furniture designers
Scottish stained glass artists and manufacturers
Alumni of the Glasgow School of Art
Glasgow School
19th-century Scottish male artists
20th-century Scottish male artists